Cineplexx is a cinema company based in Vienna, Austria, owned by Constantin Film-Foundation. The company was founded in 1993, and operates mainly in Austria where it is the largest cinema chain with 28 locations, mostly multiplex cinemas under the Cineplexx brand. The company started international expansion in 2009 and operates 61 multiplexes in 12 countries as of 2021.

History 
Cineplexx Kinobetriebe GmbH  was founded in 1993 as a joint venture between Constantin Film-Holding GmbH and Vienna's own cinema and event companies (KIBA / Wiener Stadthalle and Wiener Holding AG). The city of Vienna withdrew and sold its shares to Constantin Film-Holding GmbH in spring 1999. Constantin Film-Holding GmbH and Cineplexx Kinobetriebe GmbH are wholly owned by the Langhammer family.

The first Cineplexx cinema was opened on October 31, 1996 in Graz. It was after the Apollo Cinema reopened in December 1993 by Cineinvest, a subsidiary of Constantin Film Holding and Kiba. The largest Cineplexx which was built in November 1999 on the Danube plate, in Reichsbrücke, included 13 halls and 3,400 seats, was closed in 2011.

In March 2001 Cineplexx bought from Loews a cinema in Auhof and in December 2002 the cinema in the Vienna Twin Tower from the German Cinestar. In 2004, Constantin Film Group also took over the multiplex cinema in the Donauzentrum, the Donauplex.

Since 2009 Cineplexx has expanded in Albania, Bosnia and Herzegovina, Croatia, Greece, Italy, Kosovo, Montenegro, North Macedonia, Romania, Serbia and Slovenia.

On May 12, 2009, the first Cineplexx cinema outside Austria was opened in Bolzano, South Tyrol, Italy with 7 screens.

In January 2019, Cineplexx bought the three cinemas of the UCI chain in Austria from Odeon.

Cineplexx has expanded in Romania in April 2019 after it bought one of the largest multiplexes in Bucharest, Grand Cinema, keeping the brand. Three months later Cineplexx took over Cine Gold multiplex, also in Bucharest and rebranded it as Cineplexx. In September 2019 a multiplex was opened in Satu Mare.  Cineplexx continued to expand with a multiplex in Sibiu in February 2020, in Târgu Mureș in September 2020, and others planned in Craiova and Iași.

The latest addition is the new Cineplexx in Sarajevo with eight cinema halls totaling 1,400 seats, which opened in June 2021 and will also serve as a major venue for the annual Sarajevo Film Festival.

Projects currently under construction are a 4-screen cinema in the recently expanded ALGO Shopping Center in Algundo, near Merano, which will open in summer 2021. Furthermore, the 9-screen cinema at Belgrade Waterfront, which is already open to the public and hosts Serbia's first IMAX, will be finished in September 2021. Cineplexx's first cinema in Slovenia's capital city Ljubljana with 7 halls and 1400 seats is planned to open in spring 2022 at Supernova Shopping Center in Rudnik.

Facilities 

The multiplex offers in selected locations cinema halls equipped with laser 4K projectors, HFR, IMAX, Dolby Atmos and Dolby Cinema.

Since 2017 the company opened first halls with motion-base cinema concept MX4D in Split, Novi Sad, Belgrade and Graz, with the latest one being introduced in Vienna at Cineplexx Millennium City in 2021. Likewise, a VR concept was launched in Graz and Novi Sad on a trial basis. Also Samsung's Onyx concept, the first Cinema LED system to replace the classic projection was installed in Wienerberg.

Cinemas

References

External links

 Cineplexx Albania
 Cineplexx Austria
 Cineplexx Bosnia and Herzegovina
 Cineplexx Croatia
 Cineplexx Greece
 Cineplexx Italy
 Cineplexx Kosovo
 Cineplexx Macedonia
 Cineplexx Montenegro
 Cineplexx Romania
 Cineplexx Serbia
 Cineplexx Slovenia

Entertainment companies established in 1993
Cinema chains in Austria
Cinema chains in Croatia
Cinema chains in Italy
Cinema chains in Montenegro
Cinema chains in Romania
Cinema chains in Serbia